Roger Rodrigues da Silva (born 7 January 1985), simply known as Roger, is a Brazilian football coach and former player who played as a striker. He is the current head coach of Pouso Alegre.

Playing career
Born in Campinas, Roger was detected by Ponte Preta, where he played for three years before playing at São Paulo. In this club as a substitution, he won the Libertadores 2005.

He was loaned to Palmeiras in 2006, but was unsuccessful and in 2007, eventually returning to Ponte Preta, to dispute Serie B. After a brief spell at Al Nassr, was hired by Sport, Pernambuco where he was champion and winner of the Brazil Cup 2008.

In early 2009, even with their economic rights belonging to São Paulo, was on loan again, this time to Fluminense in a deal involving the player Arouca, who went to the club in São Paulo.

After just four months for Fluminense and with few chances in the team, especially after the arrival of Fred, eventually terminating his contract with the tricolor carioca hit and also on loan to the Vitória. In April 2010 Guarani Futebol Clube signed the forward on loan from São Paulo until December 2010.

In mid 2017, went away from field to retirate a tumor.

Honours

Club
São Paulo
Copa Libertadores: 2005

Sport
Campeonato Pernambucano: 2008
Copa do Brasil: 2008

Individual
Campeonato Paulista Team of the year: 2016

References

External links

1985 births
Living people
Brazilian footballers
Associação Atlética Ponte Preta players
São Paulo FC players
Sociedade Esportiva Palmeiras players
Al-Nasr SC (Dubai) players
Fluminense FC players
Esporte Clube Vitória players
Sport Club do Recife players
Guarani FC players
Kashiwa Reysol players
Ceará Sporting Club players
Club Athletico Paranaense players
Suwon Samsung Bluewings players
Associação Chapecoense de Futebol players
Esporte Clube Bahia players
Red Bull Brasil players
Botafogo de Futebol e Regatas players
Sport Club Internacional players
Sport Club Corinthians Paulista players
Operário Ferroviário Esporte Clube players
Associação Atlética Internacional (Limeira) players
Campeonato Brasileiro Série A players
Campeonato Brasileiro Série B players
J1 League players
J2 League players
K League 1 players
Brazilian expatriate footballers
Expatriate footballers in the United Arab Emirates
Expatriate footballers in Japan
Expatriate footballers in South Korea
Brazilian expatriate sportspeople in South Korea
UAE Pro League players
Association football forwards
Brazilian football managers
Campeonato Brasileiro Série D managers
Associação Atlética Internacional (Limeira) managers
Sportspeople from Campinas
Pouso Alegre Futebol Clube managers